The Central District of Javanrud County is a district (bakhsh) in Javanrud County, Kermanshah Province, Iran. At the 2006 census, its population was 53,048, in 11,702 families.  The District has one city: Javanrud. The District has two rural districts (dehestan): Bazan Rural District and Palanganeh Rural District.

References 

Javanrud County
Districts of Kermanshah Province